Perilla may refer to any of the following subjects:

Animals 
 Perilla - a spider genus with the sole species Perilla teres

Plants and plant products 
 Perilla - a genus of plants of the mint family
 Perilla frutescens (deulkkae), a plant used in Korean cuisine
 Perilla frutescens var. crispa (shiso), a plant used in Japanese cuisine
 Perilla oil - oil from the seeds of deulkkae
 perilla sugar - perillartine, a sweetener

People 
 Perilla - pet name of Caecilia Metella (daughter of Metellus Celer), given by her lover Ticida

Places 
  Perilla de Castro - a municipality located in Spain
  Perilla Mountains - a mountain range in Cochise County, Arizona
 Perilla (restaurant) - a New York City based restaurant owned by Harold Dieterle

Other uses 
 perilla aldehyde - perillaldehyde, a flavoring
 Perilla ketone - a natural terpenoid

See also
 Parilla (disambiguation)
 Parrilla (disambiguation)